The Ozzman Cometh is a compilation album by British heavy metal singer Ozzy Osbourne released in 1997. It is his third greatest hits collection. Its initial, limited-edition 2-CD pressing contained five previously unreleased songs. Versions released in 2002 later have only one disc, and the song "Shot in the Dark" is replaced by "Miracle Man". This was due to a legal action brought about by the song's co-writer, Phil Soussan, for unpaid royalties.

The tracks "Black Sabbath", "War Pigs", "Fairies Wear Boots", and "Behind the Wall of Sleep" are performed by Osbourne's previous band Black Sabbath during a 26 April 1970 performance on the BBC Radio 1 show "The John Peel Sessions", conducted by British DJ John Peel. "Fairies Wear Boots" and "War Pigs" are early versions of tracks that would be recorded and released on the band's second album Paranoid with new lyrics.

Track listing

Charts

Album

Singles

Certifications and sales

References

Albums produced by Roy Thomas Baker
Albums produced by Keith Olsen
Albums produced by Max Norman
Albums produced by Ron Nevison
Albums produced by John Purdell
Albums produced by Duane Baron
Ozzy Osbourne compilation albums
1997 compilation albums
Epic Records compilation albums